The Men's junior time trial of the 2011 UCI Road World Championships was a cycling event that took place on 20 September 2011 in Copenhagen, Denmark.

Final classification

References 

Men's junior time trial
UCI Road World Championships – Men's junior time trial